Ancylobacter rudongensis is a bacterium from the family of Xanthobacteraceae which has been isolated from root of the plant Spartina anglica from the beach from the Jiangsu Province in China.

References

Further reading

External links
Type strain of Ancylobacter rudongensis at BacDive -  the Bacterial Diversity Metadatabase

Hyphomicrobiales
Bacteria described in 2004